Handcart Pioneers (also known as the Handcart Pioneers Monument) is a 1926 bronze sculpture by Torleif S. Knaphus, installed in Salt Lake City’s Temple Square, in the U.S. state of Utah.

Description
The sculpture measures approximately 6 x 4 x 10 feet and rests on a stone base which measures approximately 1 x 5 x 12 feet. It depicts people moving a handcart; most are pulling the loaded cart, apart from one young boy who is pushing from the rear. A nearby plaque reads:

History
The artwork is administered by the Church of Jesus Christ of the Latter-day Saints' Museum of Church History and Art. It was surveyed by the Smithsonian Institution's "Save Outdoor Sculpture" program in 1993.

References

External links
 

1926 sculptures
Bronze sculptures in Utah
Outdoor sculptures in Salt Lake City
Sculptures of children in the United States
Sculptures of men in Utah
Sculptures of women in Utah
Statues in Utah
Temple Square